Infantado may refer to:
House of the Infantado in Portugal
Duke of the Infantado in Spain
Palace of the Infantado, house of the dukes